The Knersvlakte Nature Reserve is a nature reserve in the Knersvlakte region of South Africa's Western Cape province. The reserve, which was established on 24 September 2014, is owned by the South African branch of the World Wide Fund for Nature and managed by provincial conservation agency CapeNature.

Of the 1 500 plant species in the Knersvlakte, about 190 species are endemic to the region. Around 155 of these are threatened with extinction, as they succumb easily to climatic conditions and changes.

The Knersvlakte is one of the richest and most diverse succulent regions in the world.

References

Provincial nature reserves of the Western Cape
Nature reserves in South Africa
Matzikama Local Municipality